Anarsia malagasyella is a moth of the  family Gelechiidae. It was described by Viette in 1968. It is found in Madagascar.

References

malagasyella
Moths described in 1968
Moths of Madagascar